Daggar is a tehsil located in Buner District, Khyber Pakhtunkhwa, Pakistan. The population is 355,692 according to the 2017 census.

See also 
 List of tehsils of Khyber Pakhtunkhwa

References 

Tehsils of Khyber Pakhtunkhwa
Populated places in Buner District